Janet Kay Jensen is an American author. She was born April 3, 1951, in Berkeley, California. She earned the following degrees: B.S.Utah State University (Logan, Utah) and M.A. Northwestern University (Evanston, IL). Jensen resides in northern Utah.

Jensen's novel Don’t You Marry the Mormon Boys was awarded third prize at the 2004 Irreantum fiction contest by the Association for Mormon Letters.

Jensen's novel has grown to include an international audience. A feature article in an online Brisbane, Australia news link conducted an interview to discuss the book and current events.

Publications
Novel
Don’t You Marry the Mormon Boys (Bonneville Books, Cedar Fort Inc. 2007) 

Nonfiction
 (with Shaunda Kennedy Wenger) The Book Lover’s Cookbook: Recipes Inspired by Celebrated Works of Literature and the Passages that Feature Them (Wenger & Jensen, Ballantine Books, 2003) 

Contributing author
Writing Secrets: A Comprehensive Guide to Writing Fiction & Nonfiction in the LDS Market (LDStorymakers 2005)
The Magic of Stories: Literature-Based Language Intervention (Strong & North, Thinking Publications 1996)

References

External links
 Official website

1951 births
Living people
21st-century American novelists
Utah State University alumni
Northwestern University alumni
Writers from Berkeley, California
American women novelists
21st-century American women writers
20th-century American novelists
20th-century American women writers